The 2019 Cleveland Indians season was the 119th season for the franchise. It was the seventh season under the leadership of manager Terry Francona and fourth under general manager Mike Chernoff. The Indians played their home games at Progressive Field in Cleveland, Ohio. In April 2019, the Indians extended Francona's contract for two more years. Although they improved upon their 91–71 campaign from the previous season, they failed to win the American League Central (due to the Minnesota Twins going 101–61) and failed to qualify for the playoffs for the first time since 2015.

Season standings

American League Central

American League Wild Card

Record against opponents

Roster

Game log

|- style= "background:#fbb;"
| 1 || March 28 || @ Twins || 0–2 || Berríos (1–0) || Kluber (0–1) || Rogers (1) || 39,519 || 0–1 ||L1
|- style= "background:#bfb;"
| 2 || March 30 || @ Twins || 2–1 || Edwards (1–0) || Parker (0–1) || Hand (1) || 15,271 || 1–1 ||W1
|- style= "background:#fbb;"
| 3 || March 31 || @ Twins || 3–9 || Pérez (1–0) || Carrasco (0–1) || —  || 15,613 || 1–2 ||L1
|- style= "background:#bfb;"
| 4 || April 1 || White Sox ||  5–3 || Edwards (2–0) || Covey (0–1) || Hand (2) || 34,519 || 2–2 ||W1
|- style= "background:#fbb;"
| 5 || April 3 ||  White Sox || 3–8 || Rodón (1–1) || Kluber (0–2) || — || 10,689 || 2–3 ||L1
|- style= "background:#bfb;"
| 6 || April 4 || Blue Jays || 4–1 || Bauer (1–0) || Sanchez (1–1) || Hand (3) || 10,375 || 3–3 ||W1
|- style= "background:#bfb;"
| 7 || April 5 || Blue Jays || 3–2 || Cimber (1–0) || Biagini (0–1) || — || 12,881 || 4–3 ||W2
|- style= "background:#bfb;"
| 8 || April 6 || Blue Jays || 7–2 || Carrasco (1–1) || Pannone (0–2) || — || 18,429 || 5–3 ||W3
|- style= "background:#bfb;"
| 9 || April 7 || Blue Jays || 3–1 || Clevinger (1–0) || Stroman (0–2) || Hand (4) || 17,264 || 6–3 ||W4
|- style= "background:#bfb;"
| 10 || April 9 || @ Tigers || 8–2 || Kluber (1–2) || Zimmermann (0–1) || — || 12,114 || 7–3 ||W5
|- style= "background:#fbb;"
| 11 || April 10 || @ Tigers || 1–4 || Boyd (1–1) || Bauer (1–1) || Greene (8) ||  11,128 || 7–4 ||L1
|- style= "background:#bfb;"
| 12 || April 11 || @ Tigers || 4–0 || Bieber (1–0) || Turnbull (0–2) || — || 13,910 || 8–4 ||W1
|- style= "background:#fbb;"
| 13 || April 12 || @ Royals || 1–8 || Keller (2–1) || Carrasco (1–2) || — || 11,950 || 8–5 ||L1
|- style= "background:#fbb;"
| 14 || April 13 || @ Royals || 0–3 || Bailey (1–1) || Rodríguez (0–1) || Peralta (1) || 15,188 || 8–6 ||L2
|- style= "background:#fbb;"
| 15 || April 14 || @ Royals || 8–9 || Peralta (1–1) || Hand (0–1) || — || 14,303 || 8–7 ||L3
|- style= "background:#bfb;"
| 16 || April 15 || @ Mariners || 6–4 || Bauer (2–1) || Kikuchi (0–1) || Hand (5) || 11,214 || 9–7 ||W1
|- style= "background:#bfb;"
| 17 || April 16 || @ Mariners || 4–2 || Bieber (2–0) || Leake (2–1) || Hand (6) || 11,826 || 10–7 ||W2
|- style= "background:#bfb;"
| 18 || April 17 || @ Mariners || 1–0 || Carrasco (2–2) || Swanson (0–1) || Wittgren (1) || 13,325 || 11–7 ||W3 
|- style="background:#bbb;"
| — || April 19 || Braves || colspan="8" | Postponed (rain). Makeup date: April 20.
|- style= "background:#bfb;"
| 19 || April 20 || Braves || 8–4 || Kluber (2–2) || Teherán (2–2) || —  || 23,035 || 12–7 ||W4
|- style= "background:#fbb;"
| 20 || April 20 || Braves || 7–8 || Jackson (2–0) || Cimber (1–1) || Minter (2) || 23,035 || 12–8 ||L1
|- style= "background:#fbb;"
| 21 || April 21 || Braves || 5–11 || Fried (3–0) || Bieber (2–1) || — || 16,039 || 12–9 ||L2
|- style= "background:#fbb;"
| 22 || April 23 || Marlins || 1–3 || López (2–3) || Ramírez (0–1) || Romo (3) || 12,963 || 12–10 ||L3
|- style= "background:#bfb;"
| 23 || April 24 || Marlins || 6–4 || Wittgren (1–0) || Conley (0–3) || —  || 13,046 || 13–10 ||W1
|- style= "background:#bfb;"
| 24 || April 25 || @ Astros || 2–1 || Bauer (3–1) || Cole (1–4) || Hand (7) || 24,948 || 14–10 ||W2
|- style= "background:#bfb;"
| 25 || April 26 || @ Astros || 6–3 || Cimber (2–1) || Rondón (2–1)|| Hand (8) || 38,084 || 15–10 ||W3
|- style= "background:#fbb;"
| 26 || April 27 || @ Astros || 3–4 (10) || Osuna (2–0) || Cimber (2–2) || — || 38,667 || 15–11 ||L1
|- style= "background:#fbb;"
| 27 || April 28 || @ Astros || 1–4 || Valdez (1–1) || Carrasco (2–3) || Pressly (2) || 31,025 || 15–12 ||L2
|- style= "background:#bfb;"
| 28 || April 30 || @ Marlins || 7–4 || Bauer (4–1) || Alcántara (1–3) || Hand (9) || 7,247 || 16–12 ||W1
|-

|- style="background:#fbb;"
| 29 || May 1 || @ Marlins || 2–4 || Smith (3–0) || Kluber (2–3) || Romo (5) || 7,262 || 16–13 ||L1
|- style= "background:#bfb;"
| 30 || May 3 || Mariners || 2–1 || Hand (1–1) || Swarzak (2–1) || — || 16,334 || 17–13 ||W1
|- style= "background:#bfb;"
| 31 || May 4 || Mariners || 5–4 || Olson (1–0) || Sadzeck (0–1) || Hand (10) || 18,420 || 18–13 ||W2
|- style= "background:#fbb;"
| 32 || May 5 || Mariners || 0–10 || Swanson (1–3) || Anderson (0–1) || — || 19,665 || 18–14 ||L1
|- style= "background:#fbb;"
| 33 || May 6 || White Sox || 1–9 || Nova (1–3) || Bauer (4–2) || — || 12,745 || 18–15 ||L2
|- style= "background:#fbb;"
| 34 || May 7 || White Sox || 0–2 || Giolito (3–1) || Rodríguez (0–2)|| Colomé (7) || 12,961 || 18–16 ||L3
|- style= "background:#bfb;"
| 35 || May 8 || White Sox || 5–3 || Hand (2–1) || Fry (1–1) || — || 12,519 || 19–16 ||W1
|- style= "background:#bfb;"
| 36 || May 9 || White Sox || 5–0 (5) || Carrasco (3–3) || Bañuelos (2–2) || — || 13,247 || 20–16 ||W2
|- style= "background:#fbb;"
| 37 || May 10 || @ Athletics || 3–4 || Soria (1–2) || Hand (2–2) || — || 36,913 || 20–17 ||L1
|- style= "background:#fbb;"
| 38 || May 11 || @ Athletics || 2–3 || Treinen (2–2) || Cole (0–1) || — ||  18,278 || 20–18 ||L2
|- style= "background:#bfb;"
| 39 || May 12 || @ Athletics || 5–3 || Rodríguez (1–2) || Mengden (0–1) || Hand (11) || 18,891 || 21–18 ||W1
|- style= "background:#fbb;"
| 40 || May 13 || @ White Sox || 2–5 || López (3–4) || Bieber (2–2) || Colomé (8) || 16,471 || 21–19 ||L1
|- style= "background:#bfb;"
| 41 || May 14 || @ White Sox || 9–0 || Carrasco (4–3) || Bañuelos (2–3) || — || 18,823 || 22–19 ||W1
|- style= "background:#bfb;"
| 42 || May 16 || Orioles || 14–7 || Cole (1–1) || Ynoa (0–1) || — || 16,324 || 23–19 ||W2
|- style= "background:#fbb;"
| 43 || May 17 || Orioles || 1–5 || Bundy (2–5) || Rodríguez (1–3) || — || 22,999 || 23–20 ||L1
|- style= "background:#bfb;"
| 44 || May 18 || Orioles || 4–1 || Plutko (1–0) || Means (5–4) || Hand (12) || 25,652 || 24–20 ||W1
|- style= "background:#bfb;"
| 45 || May 19 || Orioles || 10–0 || Bieber (3–2) || Ramírez (0–2) || — || 21,377 || 25–20 ||W2
|- style= "background:#fbb;"
| 46 || May 20 || Athletics || 4–6 || Anderson (5–3) || Carrasco (4–4) || Treinen (8) || 12,563 || 25–21 ||L1
|- style= "background:#fbb;"
| 47 || May 21 || Athletics || 3–5 || Hendriks (2–0) || Bauer (4–3) || Treinen (9) || 13,705 || 25–22 ||L2
|- style= "background:#fbb;"
| 48 || May 22 || Athletics || 2–7 || Montas (6–2) || Rodríguez (1–4) || — || 17,010 || 25–23 ||L3
|- style= "background:#fbb;"
| 49 || May 23 || Rays || 2–7 || Yarbrough (3–1) || Plutko (1–1) || — ||  18,884 || 25–24 ||L4
|- style= "background:#bfb;"
| 50 || May 24 || Rays || 3–1 || A. J. Cole (2–1) || Alvarado (0–4) || Hand (13) || 24,084 || 26–24 ||W1
|- style= "background:#fbb;"
| 51 || May 25 || Rays || 2–6 || Morton (5–0) || Carrasco (4–5) || — || 25,882 || 26–25 ||L1
|- style= "background:#fbb;"
| 52 || May 26 || Rays || 3–6 || Beeks (4–0) || Bauer (4–4) || Alvarado (6) || 20,288 || 26–26 ||L2
|- style= "background:#fbb;"
| 53 || May 27 || @ Red Sox || 5–12 || Porcello (4–4) || Rodríguez (1–5) || — || 37,113 || 26–27 ||L3
|- style= "background:#bfb;"
| 54 || May 28 || @ Red Sox || 7–5 || Wittgren (2–0) || Lakins (0–1) || Hand (14) || 32,984 || 27–27 ||W1
|- style= "background:#bfb;"
| 55 || May 29 || @ Red Sox || 14–9 || Bieber (4–2) || Weber (1–1) || Hand (15) || 34,824 || 28–27 ||W2
|- style= "background:#fbb;"
| 56 || May 30 || @ White Sox || 4–10 || Bañuelos (3–4) || Carrasco (4–6) || — || 22,182 || 28–28 ||L1
|- style= "background:#fbb;"
| 57 || May 31 || @ White Sox || 1–6 || Covey (1–4) || Bauer (4–5) || — || 21,652 || 28–29 ||L2
|-

|- style= "background:#bfb;"
| 58 || June 1 || @ White Sox || 5–2 || Pérez (1–0) || Nova (3–5) || Hand (16) || 25,873 || 29–29 ||W1
|- style= "background:#fbb;"
| 59 || June 2 || @ White Sox || 0–2 || Giolito (8–1) || Plesac (0–1) || Colomé (12) || 26,453 || 29–30 ||L1
|- style= "background:#bfb;"
| 60 || June 4 || Twins || 5–2 || Bieber (5–2) || Smeltzer (0–1) || Hand (17) || 15,814 || 30–30 ||W1
|- style= "background:#bfb;"
| 61 || June 5 || Twins || 9–7 || Wittgren (3–0) || Parker (0–2) || Hand (18) || 16,962 || 31–30 ||W2
|- style= "background:#fbb;"
| 62 || June 6 || Twins || 4–5 || Berríos (8–2) || Bauer (4–6) || Rogers (6) || 15,350 || 31–31 ||L1
|- style= "background:#bfb;"
| 63 || June 7 || Yankees || 5–2 || Plesac (1–1) || Germán (9–2) || Hand (19) || 31,531 || 32–31 ||W1
|- style= "background:#bfb;"
| 64 || June 8 || Yankees || 8–4 || Plutko (2–1) || Sabathia (3–3) || — || 32,239 || 33–31 ||W2
|- style= "background:#fbb;"
| 65 || June 9 || Yankees || 6–7 (10) || Chapman (1–1) || Pérez (1–1) || Tarpley (1) || 29,028 || 33–32 ||L1
|- style= "background:#bfb;"
| 66 || June 11 || Reds || 2–1 (10) || Hand (3–2)  || Iglesias (1–6) || — || 24,101 || 34–32 ||W1
|- style= "background:#fbb;"
| 67 || June 12 || Reds || 2–7 || DeSclafani (3–3) || Plesac (1–2) || — ||24,045 || 34–33 ||L1
|- style= "background:#bfb;"
| 68 || June 14 || @ Tigers || 13–4 || Plutko (3–1) || Carpenter (1–4) || — || 22,362 || 35–33 ||W1
|- style= "background:#bfb;"
| 69 || June 15 || @ Tigers || 4–2 || Bieber (6–2) || Ramirez (3–1) || Hand (20) || 25,523 || 36–33 ||W2
|- style= "background:#bfb;"
| 70 || June 16 || @ Tigers || 8–0 || Bauer (5–6) || Turnbull (3–6) || — || 26,705 || 37–33 ||W3
|- style= "background:#fbb;"
| 71 || June 17 || @ Rangers || 2–7 || Lynn (8–4) || Clevinger (1–1) || — || 20,860 || 37–34 ||L1
|- style= "background:#bfb;"
| 72 || June 18 || @ Rangers || 10–3 || Plesac (2–2) || Sampson (5–4) || — || 19,223 || 38–34 ||W1
|- style= "background:#bfb;"
| 73 || June 19 || @ Rangers || 10–4 || Pérez (2–1) || Palumbo (0–1) || — || 22,906 || 39–34 ||W2
|- style= "background:#fbb;"
| 74 || June 20 || @ Rangers || 2–4 || Minor (7–4) || Bieber (6–3) || Kelley (9) || 18,531 || 39–35 ||L1
|- style= "background:#bfb;"
| 75 || June 21 || Tigers || 7–6 || Cimber (3–2) || Jiménez (2–5) || Hand (21) || 30,717 || 40–35 ||W1
|- style= "background:#bfb;"
| 76 || June 22 || Tigers || 2–0 || Civale (1–0) || Turnbull (3–7) || Hand (22) || 30,103 || 41–35 ||W2
|- style= "background:#bfb;"
| 77 || June 23 || Tigers || 8–3 || Plesac (3–2) || Norris (2–6) || — || 25,790 || 42–35 ||W3
|- style= "background:#bfb;"
| 78 || June 24 || Royals || 3–2 (10) || Hand (4–2) || Peralta (2–4) || — || 15,413 || 43–35 ||W4
|- style= "background:#fbb;"
| 79 || June 25 || Royals || 6–8 || McCarthy (2–1) || Hand (4–3) || Kennedy (10) || 21,766 || 43–36 ||L1
|- style= "background:#bfb;"
| 80 || June 26 || Royals || 5–3 || Bauer (6–6) || Junis (4–7) || — || 22,246 || 44–36 ||W1
|- style= "background:#fbb;"
| 81 || June 28 || @ Orioles || 0–13 || Means (7–4) || Clevinger (1–2) || — || 21,248 || 44–37 ||L1
|- style= "background:#fbb;"
| 82 || June 29 || @ Orioles || 0–13 || Cashner (8–3) || Plesac (3–3) || — || 26,998 || 44–38 ||L2
|- style= "background:#bfb;"
| 83 || June 30 || @ Orioles || 2–0 || Bieber (7–3) || Ynoa (0–6) || Hand (23) || 20,048 || 45–38 ||W1
|-

|- style="background:#bfb;"
| 84 || July 2 || @ Royals || 9–5 || Bauer (7–6) || Junis (4–8) || — || 18,934 || 46–38 ||W2
|- style="background:#bfb;"
| 85 || July 3 || @ Royals || 4–0 || Clevinger (2–2) || Duffy (3–5) || — || 25,049 || 47–38 ||W3
|- style="background:#bfb;"
| 86 || July 4 || @ Royals || 8–4 || Cimber (4–2) || López (1–7) || — || 18,076 || 48–38 ||W4
|- style="background:#bfb;"
| 87 || July 6 || @ Reds || 7–2 || Bieber (8–3) || Lorenzen (0–2) || — || 36,504 || 49–38 ||W5
|- style="background:#bfb;"
| 88 || July 7 || @ Reds || 11–1 || Bauer (8–6) || Mahle (2–9) || — || 27,041 || 50–38 ||W6
|- style="text-align:center; background:#bbcaff;"
| colspan="11" | 90th All-Star Game: Cleveland, OH
|- style="background:#fbb;"
| 89 || July 12 || Twins || 3–5 || Littell (2–0) || Pérez (2–2) || Rogers (13) || 30,857 || 50–39 ||L1
|- style="background:#fbb;"
| 90 || July 13 || Twins || 2–6 || Odorizzi (11–4) || Bauer (8–7) || — || 32,277 || 50–40 ||L2
|- style="background:#bfb;"
| 91 || July 14 || Twins || 4–3 || Cimber (5–2) || May (3–2) || Hand (24) || 25,194 || 51–40 ||W1
|- style="background:#bfb;"
| 92 || July 15 || Tigers || 8–6 || Wittgren (4–0) || Alcántara (3–2) || Hand (25) || 15,735 || 52–40 ||W2
|- style="background:#bfb;"
| 93 || July 16 || Tigers || 8–0 || Goody (1–0) || Carpenter (1–6) || — || 16,769 || 53–40 ||W3
|- style="background:#bfb;"
| 94 || July 17 || Tigers || 7–2 || Clevinger (3–2) || Turnbull (3–9) || Wittgren (2) || 18,894 || 54–40 ||W4
|- style="background:#bfb;"
| 95 || July 18 || Tigers || 6–3 || Bauer (9–7) || Boyd (6–8) || Hand (26) || 17,500 || 55–40 ||W5
|- style="background:#bfb;"
| 96 || July 19 || Royals || 10–5 || Bieber (9–3) || Montgomery (1–3) || — || 26,640 || 56–40 ||W6
|- style="background:#fbb;"
| 97 || July 20 || Royals || 0–1 || Junis (6–8) || Plutko (3–2) || Kennedy (17) || 31,958 || 56–41 ||L1
|- style="background:#bfb;"
| 98 || July 21 || Royals || 5–4 || Plesac (4–3) || Sparkman (3–6) || Hand (27) || 23,564 || 57–41 ||W1
|- style="background:#bfb;"
| 99 || July 22 || @ Blue Jays || 7–3 || Clevinger (4–2) || Borucki (0–1) || — || 22,295 || 58–41 ||W2
|- style="background:#fbb;"
| 100 || July 23 || @ Blue Jays || 1–2  || Giles (2–2) || Olson (1–1) || — || 22,186 || 58–42 ||L1
|- style="background:#bfb;"
| 101 || July 24 || @ Blue Jays || 4–0 || Bieber (10–3) || Stroman (6–11) || — || 25,385 || 59–42 ||W1
|- style="background:#bfb;"
| 102 || July 25 || @ Royals || 5–4  || Goody (2–0) || Flynn (2–2) || Cole (1) || 15,244 || 60–42 ||W2
|- style="background:#bfb;"
| 103 || July 26 || @ Royals || 8–3 || Plesac (5–3) || Junis (6–9) || — || 26,609 || 61–42 ||W3
|- style="background:#bfb;"
| 104 || July 27 || @ Royals || 9–1 || Clevinger (5–2) || Sparkman (3–7) || — || 31,181 || 62–42 ||W4
|- style="background:#fbb;"
| 105 || July 28 || @ Royals || 6–9 || Duffy (5–5) || Bauer (9–8) || Kennedy (20) || 14,380 || 62–43 ||L1
|- style="background:#fbb;"
| 106 || July 30 || Astros || 0–2 || Verlander (14–4) || Bieber (10–4) || Osuna (24) || 21,589 || 62–44 ||L2
|- style="background:#bfb;"
| 107 || July 31 || Astros || 10–4 || Plesac (6–3) || Urquidy (1–1) || — || 23,961 || 63–44 ||W1
|-

|- style="background:#fbb;"
| 108 || August 1 || Astros || 1–7 || Cole (13–5) || Salazar (0–1) || — || 21,536 || 63–45 ||L1
|- style="background:#bfb;"
| 109 || August 2 || Angels || 7–3 || Clevinger (6–2) || Cole (1–2) || — || 28,386 || 64–45 ||W1
|- style="background:#bfb;"
| 110 || August 3 || Angels || 7–2 || Plutko (4–2) || Cahill (3–7) || — || 31,222 || 65–45 ||W2
|- style="background:#bfb;"
| 111 || August 4 || Angels || 6–2 || Bieber (11–4) || Barría (4–5) || — || 26,099 || 66–45 ||W3
|- style="background:#fbb;"
| 112 || August 5 || Rangers || 0–1 || Minor (10–6) || Civale (1–1) || Leclerc (7) || 17,690 || 66–46 ||L1
|- style="background:#bbb;"
| — || August 6 || Rangers || colspan="8" | Postponed (rain). Makeup date: August 7.
|- style="background:#bfb;"
| 113 || August 7 || Rangers || 2–0 || Goody (3–0) || Jurado (6–7) || Hand (28) || 35,041 || 67–46 || W1
|- style="background:#bfb;"
| 114 || August 7 || Rangers || 5–1 || Clippard (1–0) || Lynn (14–7) || Wittgren (3) || 24,888 || 68–46 ||W2
|- style="background:#bfb;"
| 115 || August 8 || @ Twins || 7–5 || Clevinger (7–2) || Gibson (11–5) || Hand (29) || 32,517 || 69–46 ||W3
|- style="background:#bfb;"
| 116 || August 9 || @ Twins || 6–2 || Bieber (12–4) || Smeltzer (1–2) || — || 36,641 || 70–46 ||W4
|- style="background:#fbb;"
| 117 || August 10 || @ Twins || 1–4 || Odorizzi (13–5) || Plutko (4–3) || Rogers (18) || 35,268 || 70–47 ||L1
|- style="background:#bfb;"
| 118 || August 11 || @ Twins || 7–3 (10) || Hand (5–3) || Rogers (2–3) || — || 37,849 || 71–47 ||W1
|- style="background:#bfb;"
| 119 || August 12 || Red Sox || 6–5 || Hand (6–3) || Walden (7–2) || — || 24,770 || 72–47 ||W2
|- style="background:#fbb;"
| 120 || August 13 || Red Sox || 6–7 (10) || Workman (8–1) || Wittgren (4–1) || Cashner (1) || 26,662 || 72–48 ||L1
|- style="background:#fbb;"
| 121 || August 14 || Red Sox || 1–5 || Eovaldi (1–0) || Bieber (12–5) || — || 29,535 || 72–49 ||L2
|- style="background:#bfb;"
| 122 || August 15 || @ Yankees || 19–5 || Plutko (5–3) || Green (2–4) || — || 44,654 || 73–49 ||W1
|- style="background:#fbb;"
| 123 || August 16 || @ Yankees || 2–3 || Tanaka (9–6) || Civale (1–2) || Chapman (34) || 45,015 || 73–50 ||L1
|- style="background:#fbb;"
| 124 || August 17 || @ Yankees || 5–6 || Paxton (9–6) || Plesac (6–4) || Chapman (35) || 47,347 || 73–51 ||L2
|- style="background:#bfb;"
| 125 || August 18 || @ Yankees || 8–4 || Clevinger (8–2) || Sabathia (5–7) || — || 45,682 || 74–51 ||W1
|- style="background:#fbb;"
| 126 || August 20 || @ Mets || 2–9 || Matz (8–7) || Bieber (12–6) || — || 33,800 || 74–52 ||L1
|- style="background:#fbb;"
| 127 || August 21 || @ Mets || 3–4 (10) || Avilán (4–0) || Hand (6–4) || — || 28,349 || 74–53 ||L2
|- style="background:#fbb;"
| 128 || August 22 || @ Mets || 0–2 (8) || Syndergaard (9–6) || Civale (1–3) || Sewald (1) || 30,998 || 74–54 ||L3
|- style="background:#bfb;"
| 129 || August 23 || Royals || 4–1 || Plesac (7–4) || Junis (8–12) || Hand (30) || 31,946 || 75–54 ||W1
|- style="background:#bfb;"
| 130 || August 24 || Royals || 4–2 || Clevinger (9–2) || Sparkman (3–9) || Hand (31) || 33,349 || 76–54 ||W2
|- style="background:#fbb;"
| 131 || August 25 || Royals || 8–9  || Kennedy (1–2) || Goody (3–1) || López (1) || 29,360 || 76–55 ||L1
|- style="background:#bfb;"
| 132 || August 27 || @ Tigers || 10–1 || Plutko (6–3) || Turnbull (3–13) || — || 15,715 || 77–55 ||W1
|- style="background:#bfb;"
| 133 || August 28 || @ Tigers || 4–2 || Civale (2–3) || Farmer (5–5) || Hand (32) || 15,834 || 78–55 ||W2
|- style="background:#bfb;"
| 134 || August 29 || @ Tigers || 2–0 || Clevinger (10–2) || Norris (3–11) || Hand (33) || 16,855 || 79–55 ||W3
|- style="background:#fbb;"
| 135 || August 30 || @ Rays || 0–4 || Drake (3–1) || Bieber (12–7) || — || 15,294 || 79–56 ||L1
|- style="background:#fbb;"
| 136 || August 31 || @ Rays || 6–9 || Beeks (6–3) || Plesac (7–5) || Pagán (16) || 13,327 || 79–57 ||L2
|-

|- style="background:#fbb;"
| 137 || September 1 || @ Rays || 2–8 || Morton (14–6) || Plutko (6–4) || — || 14,922 || 79–58 ||L3
|- style="background:#bfb;"
| 138 || September 2 || White Sox || 11–3 || Civale (3–3) || Detwiler (2–5) || — || 16,149 || 80–58 ||W1
|- style="background:#fbb;"
| 139 || September 3 || White Sox || 5–6 || Marshall (4–2) || Carrasco (4–7) || Colomé (26) || 17,397 || 80–59 ||L1
|- style="background:#bfb;"
| 140 || September 4 || White Sox || 8–6 || Bieber (13–7) || Nova (9–12) || Wittgren (4) || 25,488 || 81–59 ||W1
|- style="background:#fbb;"
| 141 || September 5 || White Sox || 1–7 || López (9–12) || Plesac (7–6) || — || 18,913 || 81–60 ||L1
|- style="background:#bfb;"
| 142 || September 6 || @ Twins || 6–2  || Clippard (1–0) || Thorpe (2–2) || — || 35,418 || 82–60 ||W1
|- style="background:#fbb;"
| 143 || September 7 || @ Twins || 3–5 || Littell (4–0) || Cimber (5–3) || Rogers (25) || 39,573 || 82–61 ||L1
|- style="background:#bfb;"
| 144 || September 8 || @ Twins || 5–2 || Clevinger (11–2) || Dobnak (0–1) || Hand (34) || 31,380 || 83–61 ||W1
|- style="background:#bfb;"
| 145 || September 9 || @ Angels || 6–2 || Bieber (14–7) || Sandoval (0–3) || — || 35,753 || 84–61 ||W2
|- style="background:#bfb;"
| 146 || September 10 || @ Angels || 8–0 || Plesac (8–6) || Suárez (2–6) || — || 35,508 || 85–61 ||W3
|- style="background:#bfb;"
| 147 || September 11 || @ Angels || 4–3 || Carrasco (5–7) || Peters (3–3) || Cimber (1) || 33,952 || 86–61 ||W4
|- style="background:#bbb;"
| — || September 13 || Twins || colspan="8" | Postponed (rain). Makeup date: September 14. 
|- style="background:#fbb;"
| 148 || September 14 || Twins || 0–2 || Littell (5–0) || Clevinger (11–3) || Rogers (26) || 24,258 || 86–62 ||L1
|- style="background:#fbb;"
| 149 || September 14 || Twins || 5–9 || Graterol (1–0) || Pérez (2–3) || — || 31,841 || 86–63 ||L2
|- style="background:#bfb;"
| 150 || September 15 || Twins || 7–5 || Wittgren (5–1) || Romero (0–1) || Pérez (1) || 26,414 || 87–63 ||W1
|- style="background:#bfb;"
| 151 || September 17 || Tigers || 7–2 || Plutko (7–4) || Reininger (0–3) || — || 19,108 || 88–63 ||W2
|- style="background:#bfb;"
| 152 || September 18 || Tigers || 2–1  || Cimber (6–3) || Cisnero (0–4) || — || 15,828 || 89–63 ||W3
|- style="background:#bfb;"
| 153 || September 19 || Tigers || 7–0 || Clevinger (12–3) || Norris (3–13) || — || 19,432 || 90–63 ||W4
|- style="background:#bfb;"
| 154 || September 20 || Phillies || 5–2 || Bieber (15–7) || Smyly (4–7) || Carrasco (1) || 26,329 || 91–63 ||W5
|- style="background:#fbb;"
| 155 || September 21 || Phillies || 4–9 || Vargas (7–8) || Pérez (2–4) || — || 32,791 || 91–64 ||L1
|- style="background:#bfb;"
| 156 || September 22 || Phillies || 10–1 || Carrasco (6–7) || Velasquez (7–8) || — || 25,309 || 92–64 ||W1
|- style="background:#bfb;"
| 157 || September 24 || @ White Sox || 11–0 || Clevinger (13–3) || Fulmer (1–2) || — || 13,940 || 93–64 ||W2
|- style="background:#fbb;"
| 158 || September 25 || @ White Sox || 3–8 || Detwiler (3–5) || Bieber (15–8) || Colomé (30) || 15,980 || 93–65 || L1
|- style="background:#fbb;"
| 159 || September 26 || @ White Sox || 0–8 || Osich (4–0) || Civale (3–4) || — || 16,273 || 93–66 || L2
|- style="background:#fbb;"
| 160 || September 27 || @ Nationals || 2–8 || Voth (2–1) || Goody (3–2) || — || 27,434 || 93–67 || L3
|- style="background:#fbb;"
| 161 || September 28 || @ Nationals || 7–10 || Corbin (15–7) || Plutko (7–5) || — || 38,435 || 93–68 || L4
|- style="background:#fbb;"
| 162 || September 29 || @ Nationals || 2–8 || Ross (4-4) || Clevinger (13–4) || — || 36,764 || 93–69 || L5
|-

|- style="text-align:center;"
| Legend:       = Win       = Loss       = PostponementBold = Indians team member

Player stats

Batting
Note: G = Games played; AB = At bats; R = Runs scored; H = Hits; 2B = Doubles; 3B = Triples; HR = Home runs; RBI = Runs batted in; AVG = Batting average; SB = Stolen bases

Pitching
Note: W = Wins; L = Losses; ERA = Earned run average; G = Games pitched; GS = Games started; SV = Saves; IP = Innings pitched; H = Hits allowed; R = Total runs allowed; ER = Earned runs allowed; BB = Walks allowed; K = Strikeouts

Farm system

See also
 List of Cleveland Indians team records

References

External links
Cleveland Indians 2019 Schedule at MLB.com
2019 Cleveland Indians season at Baseball Reference

Cleveland Guardians seasons
Cleveland
Cleveland Indians